Opuntia elata is a species of cactus found in Bolivia, Paraguay, southern Brazil, northern Argentina, and Uruguay.

, Plants of the World Online accepted three varieties:
Opuntia elata var. delaetiana F.A.C.Weber
Opuntia elata var. elata – synonym Opuntia anacantha
Opuntia elata var. obovata E.Walther

References

External links
 
 

elata